Schultz is an unincorporated community in Pleasants County, West Virginia, United States.

The community was named after Christian Schultz, a pioneer settler.

References 

Unincorporated communities in West Virginia
Unincorporated communities in Pleasants County, West Virginia